Whytecliff Park is located near West Vancouver's Horseshoe Bay Neighbourhood, the original name of which was White Cliff City, which opened in 1909. In 1914, Colonel Albert Whyte pressed for the spelling change from White Cliff City to Whytecliff. The Whytecliff area is now distinct from Horseshoe Bay. The park, originally Rockcliffe Park, was developed by W.W. Boultbee in 1926, and a private access road was cut from the Marine Drive highway at Batchelor Bay. 

The fifty acre Boultbee estate was purchased by the Union Steamship Company in 1939 and the company operated a Bowen Island Ferry from Whytecliff during 1939-41 and 1946-1952 

The park is currently home to more than 200 marine animal species and is the first Marine Protected Area in Canada. Sea lions can be seen sunbathing on the beach during summer.

To get there, take Marine Drive west from the Lions Gate Bridge past Lighthouse Park to Horseshoe Bay and then continue on to 7100 Block Marine Drive.

References
 
Discover Vancouver

Hiking trails around Whytecliff Park

West Vancouver